The goldstripe rasbora (Rasbora chrysotaenia) is a species of ray-finned fish in the genus Rasbora. It is a benthopelagic freshwater fish found in Malaysia and Indonesia.

References 

Rasboras
Freshwater fish of Malaysia
Freshwater fish of Indonesia
Taxa named by Ernst Ahl
Fish described in 1937